The Annihilating Angel; Or, The Surface of the World is the second album by composer Paul Schütze, released in 1990 through Extreme Records.

Track listing

Personnel 
John Baldwin – illustrations
Steve Burgess – engineering
Sandro Donnadi – trumpet
Tom Fryer – guitar
Philip Jackson – illustrations
Judy Jacques – voice
Jeff Jeffers – voice
Sam Mallet – voice
Paul Schütze – keyboards, percussion, programming, production
Melissa Webb – illustrations

References

External links 
 

1990 albums
Extreme Records albums
Paul Schütze albums
Albums produced by Paul Schütze